Trayce is a given name. Notable people with the name include:

Trayce Jackson-Davis (born 2000), American basketball player
Trayce Thompson (born 1991), American baseball player

See also
Trace (name), given name and surname

Masculine given names